Fung Chi Tsuen is a village in Wang Chau, Yuen Long District, Hong Kong.

Administration
Fung Chi Tsuen is a recognized village under the New Territories Small House Policy. Fung Chi Tsuen is one of the 37 villages represented within the Ping Shan Rural Committee. For electoral purposes, Fung Chi Tsuen is part of the Ping Shan Central constituency, which is currently represented by Felix Cheung Chi-yeung.

See also
 Wang Chau housing controversy

References

External links

 Delineation of area of existing village Fung Chi Tsuen (Ping Shan) for election of resident representative (2019 to 2022)

Villages in Yuen Long District, Hong Kong
Wang Chau (Yuen Long)